I is the first solo mini-album of South Korean singer Kim Jaejoong, a member of pop group JYJ. The EP was released on 17 January 2013 and is composed of rock songs, two of which were composed by Kim Ba-da from the rock band Sinawe. One of the songs, "나만의 위로" (Healing for Myself), was a soundtrack from the film Code Name: Jackal, which starred Jaejoong and Song Ji-hyo. The album was an immediate commercial success, with all 120,000 initial copies of the album selling out within two weeks. An additional 20,000 copies manufactured to cope with the high demand were similarly sold out. A repackaged edition titled Y, which includes two new tracks and two instrumental tracks, was released on 26 February 2013 and experienced similar success, with all 50,000 initial pressings of the album selling out within 24 hours of sale.

Reception

The mini-album debuted at the top of both the Hanteo and Gaon weekly charts in Korea and broke previous pre-order records in Japan. The first single, "One Kiss", was released digitally on 8 January. The album debuted at number two on the Billboard World Chart.

Track listing

Sales

Chart positions

Weekly album charts

Monthly album charts

Singles charts

Other charts

References

External links
 Official music video of "Mine"

2013 EPs
A&G Modes EPs
Kim Jae-joong albums
JYJ albums